Karuvakkurichi (Karuvai) is a village in Mannargudi taluk in Thiruvarur district in the Indian state of Tamil Nadu. The village is 12 km away from Mannargudi in west direction and 13 km from Orthanadu in East direction (Thanjavur District). Mannargudi railway station is nearest one.

Villages in Tiruvarur district